Back in the Game is an album by the American soul musician Syl Johnson. It was released in 1994. Johnson had not recorded an album since the 1980s, but had witnessed a revival of his music due its use as samples in hip hop production.

Production
On the majority of its tracks, the album marked a reunion between Johnson and the Hi Rhythm Section. It was produced by Pete Nathan. Johnson duets with his daughter Syleena on "Dipped in the Water". Back in the Game contains covers of Magic Sam's "All Your Love" and Little Junior Parker's version of "Driving Wheel".

Critical reception

The St. Louis Post-Dispatch wrote that Johnson's "vocals swoop, charge, lunge, and bark with all the mastery of a classic soul singer, but his songs are rarely melodically complex, nor do they develop linearly." The Chicago Tribune called the album "a stunning return to form," writing that "Johnson's voice is still a piercing, bittersweet instrument and his guitar-playing remains tersely eloquent"; the paper later listed Back in the Game as the second best contemporary blues album of 1994. 

The Washington Post thought that it "shows [Johnson's] funky blues and soul skills remain surprisingly intact, as does the sinewy sensuality of his vocals." Deeming the music Chicago R&B, the Chicago Sun-Times wrote that the album "showcases the intrinsic charms of the form, recalling the days when R&B record companies like One-derful, Brunswick and Vee-Jay flourished on South Michigan Avenue."

AllMusic wrote that "although the Chicagoan moves into 12-bar blues territory on 'All of Your Love' and Roosevelt Sykes' 'Driving Wheel', it must be stressed that the majority of songs on this album are soul rather than blues." MusicHound R&B: The Essential Album Guide opined that the album "may contain the best version of the much-recorded Al Green song 'Take Me to the River'."

Track listing

Personnel
Syl Johnson - vocals, guitar, harmonica
Howard Grimes, Morris Jennings - drums
Charles Hodges, Fred Hodges - piano, organ
Jon Logan, Vincent Varko - organ
Leroy Hodges, Anthony Morris - bass
Teenie Hodges, Pete Nathan, Will Crosby - guitar
Ken Vandermark - tenor saxophone
Willie Henderson - baritone saxophone
Kenny Anderson - trumpet
Syleena Johnson - backing vocals, vocals on "Dipped in the Water"
Theresa Davis - backing vocals

References

1994 albums
Delmark Records albums